Handsworth Songs is a 1986 British documentary film directed by John Akomfrah and produced by Lina Gopaul.  It was filmed during the 1985 riots in Handsworth and London. The production company was the Black Audio Film Collective, who also wrote the screenplay.  With cinematography by Sebastian Shah and music by Trevor Mathison, there were voice-overs by Pervais Khan, Meera Syal, Yvonne Weekes, Sachkhand Nanak Dham and Mr. McClean.

Background
Handsworth Songs was commissioned by Channel 4 for their series Britain: The Lie of the Land and won seven prizes internationally, including the John Grierson Award for Best Documentary (BFI). The production company used their now renowned methods of intermixing newsreel, still photos and a sound mosaic, creating an experimental multi-layered narrative. It gives accounts of those involved in or observing the 1985 riots and more significantly their personal reflections.

Viewers create their own interpretation of narrative through navigation of the multi-faceted material presented, which is a direct response to the fragmented presentation of the story of the riots. Ann Ogidi, the author, sees it as a journey as if wandering through an art gallery with images of the 1950s.

In 1983 the Black Audio Film Collective came together to encourage a Black film culture within film and video, specifically looking at questions of Black representation, including colonial imagery and anti-racist/sexist film material. Their work includes Signs of Empire (1989), Images of Nationality and Handsworth Songs (1986).

In an interview with Paul Gilroy and Jim Pines, the Black Audio Film Collective define the specific audience for their films as an imaginary construction, films made for Diasporic peoples, rather than simply Black people. This is almost a marketing strategy to help define where they might be shown. It analyses the limits of definition of an audience.

Release
The film had its premiere at the Birmingham Film and Television Festival on 24 October 1986.

References

External links
 Ann Ogidi, "Handsworth Songs (1986)", BFI Screen Online.
 Handsworth Songs at IMDb.

1986 films
1986 documentary films
Black British cinema
Black British mass media
Black British films
British documentary films
Films directed by John Akomfrah
1980s English-language films
1980s British films